Isotoma scapigera,  commonly known as long-scaped isotome, is a small herbaceous plant in the family Campanulaceae native to Western Australia.

It blooms between September and December producing blue-purple flowers.

It is found in wet depressions, around salt lakes and on sand dunes in the Mid West, Wheatbelt, South West and Goldfields-Esperance regions of Western Australia where it grows in shallow sandy-clay soils.

References

scapigera
Flora of Western Australia
Plants described in 1834